The Palatka South Historic District is a U.S. historic district (designated as such on November 17, 1983) located in Palatka, Florida. The district is bounded by the St. Johns River, Oak, South 9th, and Morris Streets. It contains 243 historic buildings.

References

External links
 Putnam County listings at National Register of Historic Places

National Register of Historic Places in Putnam County, Florida
Historic districts on the National Register of Historic Places in Florida
Neighborhoods in Palatka, Florida
Tourist attractions in Palatka, Florida